Harold Hastings (19 December 1916 – 30 May 1973) was an American composer and conductor. He was born in New York City and subsequently studied at New York University. In his early career, he conducted radio and television orchestras. He also composed music for television advertisements. In 1950, he composed the music for the Broadway revue Tickets, Please!. Following this, he began work on Broadway as an arranger, orchestrator, and musical director. From 1950 to 1973, he worked as musical director or arranger for twenty-five Broadway musicals, several of which became renowned classics of Broadway. In 1973, he died of an apparent heart attack at his home in Larchmont, New York.

Selected work 
 Tickets, Please! (1950)
 A Funny Thing Happened on the Way to the Forum (1962)
 She Loves Me (1963)
 Cabaret (1966)
 Company (1970)
 Follies (1971)
 A Little Night Music (1973)

References

External links

1916 births
1973 deaths
Music directors
American male composers
20th-century American composers
20th-century American male musicians
New York University alumni